Steponas (shortened as Stepas) is a Lithuanian masculine given name. It is a cognate of the English language name Stephen, and may refer to:
Steponas Babrauskas (born 1984), a Lithuanian professional basketball player
Steponas Darašius (1896–1933), a Lithuanian-born American pilot
Steponas Kairys (1879–1964), a Lithuanian engineer, nationalist, and social democrat
Steponas Kazimieraitis (1933–1995), a Lithuanian painter

Lithuanian masculine given names